Let's Dance 2016 was the eleventh season of the Swedish celebrity dancing show Let's Dance. The season was hosted by David Hellenius and Jessica Almenäs. The show was broadcast on TV4.

Couples

Scoring chart

Dance chart

Notes

References 

2016
TV4 (Sweden) original programming
2016 Swedish television seasons